The B. V. Sargent House is a historic house in Salinas, California, United States.  It is listed on the National Register of Historic Places for representing a change in local building styles and opening popularity in the area for Colonial Revival architecture.

It was built in 1897 and is a work of architect William H. Weeks.  Its National Register nomination asserts it is an "excellent example of changing tastes in architecture at the turn of the twentieth century in rural California", and that the house "is also perhaps, the most fully realized expression of architect William H. Weeks' (1864–1936) early 'modified colonial' style".  It cost $7,500 to be built by contractor L.U. Grant.

It was listed on the National Register of Historic Places in 1980.

In 2014 it was purchased by the Episcopal Diocese of El Camino Real and renovated as the diocesan headquarters, which was moved there from Seaside, California, in January 2015.

References

External links
 

Buildings and structures in Salinas, California
Houses completed in 1897
Houses in Monterey County, California
Houses on the National Register of Historic Places in California
Houses on the National Register of Historic Places in Monterey County, California
National Register of Historic Places in Monterey County, California